James Isaac Abbott (December 15, 1884 – April 3, 1926) was an American Negro league outfielder in the 1900s.

A native of Brooklyn, New York, Abbott made his Negro leagues debut in 1906 with the Brooklyn Royal Giants. He went on to play for the Cuban Giants the following season. Abbott died in Brooklyn in 1926 at age 41.

References

External links
Baseball statistics and player information from Baseball-Reference Black Baseball Stats and Seamheads

1884 births
1926 deaths
Brooklyn Royal Giants players
Cuban Giants players